Georgina Hockenhull (born 4 June 1997) is a British artistic gymnast. She represented Wales at the 2014 Commonwealth Games in Glasgow where she won two historic medals for Welsh women's artistic gymnastics. Hockenhull will also compete for Great Britain at the first ever European Games.

References

1997 births
Living people
Sportspeople from Shrewsbury
Welsh female artistic gymnasts
Gymnasts at the 2014 Commonwealth Games
Gymnasts at the 2015 European Games
European Games competitors for Great Britain
Commonwealth Games bronze medallists for Wales
Commonwealth Games medallists in gymnastics
Medallists at the 2014 Commonwealth Games